Damoh is a city in the Indian state of Madhya Pradesh. The city is also the district headquarters of Damoh district.

History

Early history
Stone Age tools have been found in Singrampur Valley and it is believed that the area has been inhabited for thousands of years.  Around the fifth century, it was part of the empire of Guptas of Pataliputra. This has been evidenced by plaques and coins, and monuments from the reigns of Samudragupta, Chandragupta I, and Skandgupta. From the eighth to twelfth centuries, some parts of the Damoh district were in the Chedi Empire, ruled by the Kalchuri dynasty from its capital Tripuri. The temple at Nohta demonstrates Kalchuri's influence in the tenth century. Some regions of the district were under the Chandels of the Jejak-Bhukti.

Sultans
Around the beginning of the fourteenth century, the administrative centre of the Chanderi province of the Khalji dynasty was moved to Damoh.

The era of Muslim rule began in the fourteenth century. Stone carvings at Salaiya and Batiyagarh mention Khalji and Tuglaq Sultans. The Sultan of Malwa later annexed the region.

Gond and Maratha rule
In the last quarter of the fifteenth century, Sangram Shah of the Gond dynasty annexed the region into his empire organized around 52 forts. This was an era of peace and prosperity for the region. In Singrampur, Rani Durgawati attained martyrdom battling against the Mughal Empire, represented by its General Asaf Khan and his army.

Bundelas entered the region for a brief time span, after which Marathas took over in 1732. Marathas remained in control until the British annexed the Marathas kingdom after the death of Peshwa in 1888. The Diwanji ki Talaiya and the Ram Mandir were constructed by the Maratha administrators.

Modern history
Damoh took part in the struggle for independence from the British. Under the leadership of Thakur Kishore Singh of Hindoria, Raja Devi Singh of Singrampur, Pancham Singh of Karijog, Gangadhar Rao, Raghunath Rao, Mejban Singh, and Govind Rao were among those who took part in the 1857 revolt.

Damoh suffered from famine in 1896-97 and 1900. By 1899 the India Midland Railway had completed the construction of Sagar–Damoh link and Damoh–Katni links. Freedom fighter Seth Govind Das was jailed in Damoh in 1923, and wrote a number of Hindi plays while imprisoned. In 1929, Acharya Shantisagar visited Damoh, the first such visit by a Digambar Muni to Damoh after several centuries.

In 1933, Mahatma Gandhi visited Damoh. In 1946, Sagar University was established as the region's primary centre for higher education.

In 1947, with India's independence from British Raj, the Central Provinces were reorganized as the state of Madhya Pradesh. The town of Damoh had its first-degree college established in 1961 by Shiksha Prasar Samiti, a volunteer organization.

Geography

According to the 2001 India census, Damoh city had a population of 112,160 (total urban population is 147,661). Males constituted 53% of the population and females 47%. Damoh had an average literacy rate of 73%, above the national average of 59.5%: male literacy was 89% and female literacy was 66%. 14% of the population was under 6 years of age.

Climate

Administration
Damoh city has a Nagar Palika Parishad with the elected head Malti Asati. Tarun Rathi is the current DM & Collector for the Damoh District. The current Member of Legislative Assembly from Damoh constituency is Mr. Ajay Kumar Tandon.

References

External links
 
 Damoh website
 Damoh News website

 
Cities in Bundelkhand
Cities in Madhya Pradesh